The Marquis of San Saturnino  is a title of Spanish nobility granted on 21 December 1688 by the King Charles II of Spain to D. Pedro Álvarez de Reynoso y Andrade, Galloso y Feijoo, Perpetual “Regidor” (Mayor) of Ourense. His name refers to the Galician municipality of San Saturnino situated in the province of Corunna.

Famous members include the 6th Marquis Don Jose Mariano Quindos y Tejada, Mayor of Madrid, Gentlemen of the Royal Maestranza de caballería of Ronda, Gentleman Great Cross of the Order of Charles III, Senator, “ Gentilhombre de camara” (Gentleman of the Bedchamber) to the King Alfonso XII and the 7th Marchioness Doña Maria de la Natividad Quindos y Villaroel, his daughter, also Duchess of la Conquista, and Marchioness of Gracia Real de Ledesma, of Palacios and Viscountess of la Frontera, “Camarera mayor” (First Lady of the Bedchamber) to Queen Maria Christina of Austria. Also well known are the 8th Marquis, Don Alfredo Moreno Uribe,  who was vice president of RENFE, the Spanish national Railway Company and his nephew, the present and 10th Marquis, Don Jose Manuel Romero Moreno,  also 8th Count of Fontao. The 10th Marquis is the lawyer of the household and family of HM King Juan Carlos I of Spain. Also he is the president of the CEAR and the vice president of the FRIDE Foundations. He is institutional member of the Club of Madrid and member of the Board of the Trustees of Patrimonio Nacional.

Marquises of San Saturnino

 Don Pedro Álvarez de Reynoso, 1st Marquis of San Saturnino. 1688- Married to Doña Rosa de Andrade.
 Doña Rosa Álvarez de Reynoso y Andrade, 2nd Marchioness of San Saturnino, daughter of the 1st Marquis. Married to Don Alvaro Quindos y Bolano.
 Don José Jacinto Quindos y Reynoso de Andrade, 3rd Marquis of San Saturnino, son of the 2nd Marchioness. Married to Doña Jacinta Pardo.
 Don José Javier Quindos y Pardo, 4th Marquis of San Saturnino, son of the 3rd Marquis. Married to Doña Carmen Quiroga y Quindos, his niece.
 Don José María Quindos y Quiroga -1821, 5th Marquis of San Saturnino, son of the 4th Marquis. Married to Doña Segunda Tejada Eulate.
 Don José Mariano Quindos y Tejada1822-1900, 6th Marquis of San Saturnino, son of the 5th Marquis. Married to Doña Fernanda Villaroel Goicolea, Viscountess of la Frontera.
 Doña María de la Natividad Quindos y Villaroel 1900-1953, 7th Marchioness of San Saturnino, also 2nd Duchess of la Conquista, Grandee of Spain,   Camarera mayor to the Queen, daughter of the 6th Marquis. Married to Don Asis Arias Davila Matheu, Count of Cumbres Altas, Ambassador of Spain, “ Gentilhombre Grande de España” (Gentleman Grandee of Spain) to the King Alfonso XIII. Without issue, the title was inherited by the son of a third cousin, the 3rd Count of Fontao
 Don Alfredo Moreno Uribe 1954-1981, 8th Marquis of San Saturnino, also 5th Count of Fontao. Married to Doña Ana Rosa Gomez y Rodulfo. Without issue the title was inherited by his sister
 Doña María Moreno Uribe 1981-1991, 9th Marchioness of San Saturnino, also 6th Countess of Fontao. Without issue the title was inherited by her nephew
  Don Jose Manuel Romero Moreno 1993- actual titular, 10th Marquis of San Saturnino, also 8th Count of Fontao. Married to Doña Ana Duplá del Moral

References
 Elenco de Grandezas y Títulos Nobiliarios españoles. Instituto "Salazar y Castro", C.S.I.C.

Marquesses of Spain
Noble titles created in 1688
1688 establishments in Spain